One Quiet Night is a solo acoustic guitar album by Pat Metheny that won the Grammy Award for Best New Age Album in 2004. He recorded the album at his home studio on a baritone guitar built for him by Linda Manzer.

In the liner notes, Metheny called One Quiet Night a homemade album that was recorded with one guitar, one microphone, and mistakes. Most of the album was recorded in one day, November 24, 2001, with additional recording in January 2003. He included two of his favorite songs, "My Song" by Keith Jarrett and "Ferry Cross the Mersey" by Gerry and the Pacemakers, and a more recent favorite, "Don't Know Why" by Jesse Harris, made popular by vocalist Norah Jones; "Last Train Home", which he had been playing on baritone guitar during a tour; and two new songs, "Song for the Boys" and "Over on 4th Street". Metheny produced the album and Steve Rodby was co-producer.

Track listing

Note
Track 13 is a bonus track available on the 2009 Nonesuch Records reissue.

Personnel
 Pat Metheny – baritone guitar

Awards
Grammy Awards

References

2003 albums
Grammy Award for Best New Age Album
Pat Metheny albums
Warner Records albums
New-age albums by American artists
Instrumental albums